Piron may refer to:

People
 Alexis Piron (1689-1773), a French dramatist
 Armand J. Piron (1888-1943), a U.S. jazz musician
 Claude Piron (1931-2008), a Swiss translator
 Constantin Piron (1932-2012), a Belgian physicist
 Jean-Baptiste Piron (1896-1974), a Belgian general

Other uses
 Brigade Piron, a Belgian Infantry Brigade

See also
 Prion, an infectious agent